Bethel Chapel AME Church is a historic African Methodist Episcopal church located at the junction of 6th and Tennessee Streets in Louisiana, Pike County, Missouri. It was built in 1884, and is a one-story, rectangular, gable roof brick church.  It measures 60 feet by 37 feet and sits on a cut limestone foundation.

It was listed on the National Register of Historic Places in 1995.

References

African-American history of Missouri
African Methodist Episcopal churches in Missouri
Churches completed in 1884
Churches on the National Register of Historic Places in Missouri
Buildings and structures in Pike County, Missouri
National Register of Historic Places in Pike County, Missouri
1884 establishments in Missouri